is a Japanese footballer who plays as a midfielder for  club Iwaki FC.

Youth career
Saga was a good player at junior high school level and was even selected for a Japan U-15 training camp. After graduating from junior high, there was interest from some J.League clubs but Saga decided to go to Aomori Yamada High School. Saga was an important player for the school, as they reached the semi-final of the All Japan High School Soccer Tournament in 2016 and won the competition in 2017 with a convincing 5–0 victory in the final. Saga started every game in the competition scoring three goals and scored his team's second goal in the final itself. Aomori Yamada also were champions of the Prince Takamado Cup U-18 Football League in 2016 after beating Sanfrecce Hiroshima Youth in the final, with Saga playing in every one of their games throughout the competition.

Following graduation from high school in 2017, Saga went on to Sendai University. In his third year, he was appointed captain and was part of the team that both beat JFL team Iwaki FC in the first round of the Emperor's Cup where he scored their second goal and narrowly lost in the second round to J2 League club Yokohama FC.

Club career
In December 2020, it was announced that Saga would be signing for JFL team Iwaki FC for the 2021 season. He made his debut for the team in March in a 2–1 league victory over Veertien Mie and scored his first goal in a 1–1 draw with ReinMeer Aomori. At the end of the 2021 season, Saga had participated in all 32 games and scored 8 goals, helping Iwaki FC gain promotion to the J3 League. He was named as Rookie of the Year and was also inducted into the 2021 JFL Best XI.

In the 2022 season, Saga scored on his J.League debut in a 1–1 draw with Kagoshima United. Another excellent season ensued for him as he helped Iwaki to back-to-back promotions, playing in all 34 of their league games and scoring 5 goals. For the second season running, Saga was inducted into the league's Best XI.

Career statistics

Club

Honours

 Iwaki FC
Japan Football League : 2021
J3 League : 2022

 Individual
JFL Rookie of the Year: 2021
JFL Best XI: 2021
J3 League Best XI: 2022

References

External links
Profile at Iwaki FC
Profile at J.League

1998 births
Living people
Japanese footballers
Association football midfielders
Association football people from Aomori Prefecture
Sendai University alumni
Iwaki FC players
J3 League players
J2 League players